Alyson Batista Brandão (born June 21, 1981), also known as Alyson Batista, is a Brazilian footballer currently playing football for Juventud Independiente.

External links

1981 births
Living people
Brazilian footballers
Brazilian expatriate footballers
C.D. Águila footballers
C.D. Juventud Independiente players
Expatriate footballers in El Salvador
Expatriate footballers in Guatemala
Association football forwards
Sportspeople from Paraíba